NPED may refer to:

 Non-primary explosive detonator
 Nuclear Power and Energy Division, a research organisation within the Bangladesh Atomic Energy Commission
 npED, nonphosphorylative ED, a variant of the Entner–Doudoroff pathway